Avraham "Avi" Rikan (born September 10, 1988) is an Israeli professional footballer who plays as a defender or midfielder for Maccabi Tel Aviv. His previous clubs include Maccabi Herzliya, Hapoel Petah Tikva, Beitar Jerusalem, and FC Zürich. At international level, Rikan was capped at levels from under-17 to senior team.

Early life
Rikan was born in the Israeli settlement Ma'ale Adumim in the West Bank, to a Sephardic Jewish family.

Honours
Beitar Jerusalem
 Toto Cup: 2009–10

FC Zürich
 Swiss Cup: 2013–14

Maccabi Tel Aviv
 Israeli Premier League (2): 2018–19, 2019-20
 Toto Cup (3): 2017–18, 2018–19, 2020-21
 Israel Super Cup (2): 2019, 2020

See also 
 List of Jewish footballers
 List of Jews in sports
 List of Israelis

References

External links
 
 

1987 births
Living people
Israeli Sephardi Jews
Israeli Jews
Israeli settlers
Israeli footballers
Jewish footballers
Israel under-21 international footballers
Beitar Jerusalem F.C. players
Maccabi Herzliya F.C. players
Hapoel Petah Tikva F.C. players
FC Zürich players
Maccabi Tel Aviv F.C. players
Association football midfielders
Israeli Premier League players
Swiss Super League players
Israeli expatriate footballers
Expatriate footballers in Switzerland
Israeli expatriate sportspeople in Switzerland
Footballers from Ma'ale Adumim
Israeli people of Kurdish-Jewish descent